Professor Gerhard Böwering is a German academic, currently Professor of Islamic Studies within the Department of Religious Studies, Yale University. He was elected to the American Philosophical Society in 1994. He was awarded a Guggenheim Fellowship in 2005 following his "formative influence of al-Sulami's commentary on the Qur'an."

Academic career
Böwering was previously an academic at University of Pennsylvania, Philadelphia.

God and his Attributes
Professor Böwering was an author of articles in the Encyclopaedia of the Quran including Chronology and the Quran and God and his Attributes. 

Sahih Bukhari Hadith recorded that Abu Hurairah reported that God has ninety-nine names (99 Attributes of Allah). Böwering refers to Chapter 17 of the Quran (al isrāʼ) (17:110) as the locus classicus to which explicit lists of the names used to be attached in  Qur'anic exegesis (tafsir). 

According to Böwering,

According to Böwering, in contrast with pre-Islamic Arabian polytheism, God in Islam does not have associates and companions, nor is there any kinship between God (Allah) and jinn.

Publications
The Mystical Vision of Existence in Classical Islam. Berlin-New York, 1980.
The Comfort of the Mystics: A Manual and Anthology of Early Sufism. Brill, Leiden, 2013.
The Princeton Encyclopedia of Islamic Political Thought (editors: Gerhard Böwering, Patricia Crone and Mahan Mirza). Princeton University Press, 2013, . 
The Minor Qur’an Commentary of al-Sulami, Beirut, 1995, 2nd ed., 1997.
Sufi Inquiries and Interpretations, Beirut, 2010.  
Sufi Treatises, Beirut, 2009.

References

External links
 Profile on Yale University website

German Islamic studies scholars
Year of birth missing (living people)
Living people
Members of the American Philosophical Society